Blanca Palmer Soler (born 10 February 1999) is a Spanish taekwondo athlete.

References

1999 births
Living people
Spanish female taekwondo practitioners
European Taekwondo Championships medalists
20th-century Spanish women
21st-century Spanish women